Chris Dapolito is an American college football coach and former player. He served as the head football coach at Pace University from 2010 to 2013, compiling a record of 1–38. Dapolito played college football at Duke University, where he was a starting quarterback during the 2003 and 2004 seasons.

Head coaching record

References

Year of birth missing (living people)
Living people
American football quarterbacks
Duke Blue Devils football players
Pace Setters football coaches